The 2009 NAIA Football National Championship was played on December 19, 2009 at Barron Stadium in Rome, Georgia.  The championship was won by the Sioux Falls Cougars over the Lindenwood Lions by a score of 25–22.

Tournament bracket

  * denotes OT.

References

NAIA Football National Championship
Sioux Falls Cougars football games
Lindenwood Lions football games
NAIA Football National Championship
NAIA Football National Championship